Moses Shaw (November 8, 1861 – February 3, 1934) was a member of the Wisconsin State Assembly.

Biography
Shaw was born on November 8, 1861 in Ahnapee, Wisconsin.

He died from heart disease at his home in Ahnapee on February 3, 1934.

Career
Shaw was elected to the Assembly in 1908. Other duties he held include serving as the town chairman (similar to mayor) of Ahnapee. He was a Republican.

References

External links

People from Ahnapee, Wisconsin
Republican Party members of the Wisconsin State Assembly
Mayors of places in Wisconsin
1861 births
1934 deaths
Burials in Wisconsin
Leaders of the American Society of Equity